Yafan is a rural town in Wucheng District of Jinhua, eastern China's Zhejiang province.

Geography
The Meixi Stream passes through the western town. The Wuyi River flows through the northern town.

Mount Leiniu is a mountain in the town.

Economy
The local economy is primarily based upon agriculture and local industry. Vegetables are the main cash crops.

Education
 Yafan Middle school

Transportation
The South Second Ring East Road passes across the town.

References

Divisions of Wucheng District
Towns of Jinhua